Glipidiomorpha fahraei is a species of beetle in the genus Glipidiomorpha of the family Mordellidae. It was described in 1975 by Maeklin.

References

Beetles described in 1975
Mordellidae